John Quiller Rowett (1876 – 1 October 1924) was a British businessman, philanthropist, and co-founder of the Rowett Research Institute.

Shackleton 

A schoolfriend of Sir Ernest Shackleton at Dulwich College, Rowett was the sole financial backer for Shackleton's final Antarctic venture, the Shackleton–Rowett expedition of 1921–1922, on the adapted sealer Quest. Rowett Island is named after him. In 1920, Rowett promised a cornerstone amount towards the new expedition. In late May 1922, after Shackleton had failed to raise the remaining funds elsewhere, Rowett agreed to finance the entire Shackleton-Rowett Expedition. After Shackleton's death, Rowett presented the James Caird to Dulwich College. 

A mountain on Gough Island, a remote volcanic island of the Tristan da Cunha group in the South Atlantic, is named in his honour. After Shackleton's death in South Georgia, the expedition visited Gough Island in the tiny (125-ton) , with parties going ashore from 28 May 1922 for a few days.

Death 
On 1 October 1924, believing his business affairs to be on a downturn, Rowett killed himself aged 48. He died at 9 Hyde Park Terrace, London, leaving an estate valued for probate at £48,533.

Notes and references

Sources
Chojecki, Jan (2022). The Quest Chronicle - The Story of the Shackleton-Rowett Expedition. Goldcrest. ISBN 9781913719722

The Tristan da Cunha Association Newsletter no. 53, August 2013

1876 births
1924 deaths
British philanthropists
People educated at Dulwich College
1924 suicides
Suicides by hanging in England
Suicides in Westminster